The 625th Strategic Operations Squadron (STOS) is a United States Air Force nuclear missile control & support squadron. The 625th STOS has five flights that play different roles in this mission. The Latin motto of the 625th STOS is Si vis pacem para bellum, which means, "If you wish for peace, prepare for war."

The 625th STOS is located at Offutt AFB, Nebraska and falls under the 595th Command and Control Group (C2G), 8th Air Force, Air Force Global Strike Command (AFGSC).

625th STOS flights

Airborne Launch Control System Operations flight (DOO)
The Airborne Launch Control System (ALCS) operations flight provides combat forces for the United States Strategic Command "Looking Glass" Airborne Command Post (ABNCP) on board the Navy's E-6B Mercury aircraft. Flying as integral members of the ABNCP battle staff, the ALCS crew, using on-board equipment, provides a survivable means to launch the Nation's LGM-30G Minuteman III Intercontinental Ballistic Missile (ICBM) force.

ICBM Targeting flight (DOM)
The ICBM Targeting flight, working closely with United States Strategic Command (USSTRATCOM) and JFCC-GS, maintains current and accurate targeting for the Nation's LGM-30G Minuteman III ICBM fleet. Additionally, the flight produces the targeting for all ICBM test launches, support Air Force Global Strike Command software tests, and develops, documents, verifies and maintains targeting software programs and operating procedures required for daily ICBM alert operations.

ALCS Training and Evaluation flight (DOT)
The ALCS Training and Evaluation flight provides simulator and classroom training to Missile Combat Crew-Airborne missileers who operate the Airborne Launch Control System on board the E-6B Mercury. The ALCS Training and Evaluation flight also provides ALCS initial Mission Qualification Training and Combat Mission Ready currency training and evaluations.

Test and Analysis flight (DOX)
The Test and Analysis flight executes flight safety zones and optimum launch tracks for the ALCS on board the U.S. Navy E-6B Mercury aircraft. The team oversees flight performance analysis and capability assessments of U.S. and foreign ballistic missile weapon systems. The team also serves as the airborne test conductor for all ICBM force development evaluation missions in which they lead, plan and coordinate Airborne Launch Control System test missions with USSTRATCOM, AFGSC, US Navy and other national agencies.

Systems Development flight (DOS)
The Systems Development flight develops documents, verifies and maintains the operational readiness for ICBM targeting software programs and operating procedures required for daily Minuteman III ICBM targeting operations. Additionally, they directly support the Targeting flight and the Test and Analysis flight through software development, programs, operations and network sustainment.

History
The squadron was first activated at Offutt Air Force Base, Nebraska, on April 15, 1996, as the 625th Missile Operations Flight (MOF)  and was the product of a number of organizational changes within the ICBM community subsequent to the end of the Cold War. It reported to Air Force Space Command. The MOF's mission was to deploy ICBM targeting, train ALCS crews and ensure operational capability of strategic communications networks (SACCS) between operational field units and national leadership. The unit also analyzed foreign ballistic missiles and provided threat information to the Ballistic Missile Early Warning System.

Re-designated the 625th Strategic Operations Squadron (STOS) on June 14, 2007, reassigned from under Air Force Space Command to Air Force Global Strike Command on December 1, 2009, and realigned under the 595th Command and Control Group (C2G) on October 1, 2016, the unit continues to provide the same critical capability for our national defense. Under the 595th C2G, the 625th STOS maintains unique command structure reporting to Eighth Air Force for organize, train and equip functions, while directly reporting to Task Force 214 and USSTRATCOM for all warfighter-related matters.

On June 1, 2017, the functions and personnel of the Strategic Automated Command and Control System (SACCS) flight, which formerly was aligned under the 625th STOS, was transferred to the 595th Strategic Communications Squadron of the 595th C2G.

Emblem significance
The blue background represents sky, constancy, devotion, loyalty, and thought that contribute to the defense of the nation. The dark sky-blue field represents the atmospheric operating medium while the ultramarine/reflex-blue field represents the space operating medium. The red represent boldness, hardiness, liberty, patriotism, strength, and valor in unit character. The white represents the maturity and perfection demanded to accomplish every mission. Lastly, the gold represents the 625th STOS’ combined heritage from both 8th and 20th Air Forces, Air Force Global Strike Command and United States Strategic Command.

The three red and gold lines with red arrow heads symbolize the squadron's commitment to the ever vigilant forces at three missile wings: F.E. Warren, Malmstrom and Minot AFBs. The three white stars represent the squadron's three primary contributions to nuclear deterrence: Survivability, provided by an airborne platform, the force multiplying capability proven through rigorous tests and evaluations, and the pristine re-targeting verified and provided to on-alert ICBMs.

Previous designations
 625th Strategic Operations Squadron (14 June 2007–Present)
 625th Missile Operations Flight (1 April 1996 – 14 June 2007)

Bases stationed
Offutt AFB, Nebraska (15 April 1996–Present)

Missiles, aircraft, and systems operated
E-6B Mercury
Airborne Launch Control System
LGM-30G Minuteman III ICBM

Decorations
Air Force Outstanding Unit Award 
1 October 2001 – 30 September 2003
1 October 1999 – 30 September 2001
1 October 1995 – 30 September 1997

See also

Airborne Launch Control System
595th Command and Control Group
Eighth Air Force
Air Force Global Strike Command
United States Strategic Command
Post Attack Command and Control System
Operation Looking Glass
Airborne Launch Control Center

References

Military units and formations in Nebraska